The Nobel Prize is an international prize awarded annually since 1901 for achievements in Physics, Chemistry, Physiology or Medicine, Literature, and Peace. An associated prize in Economic Sciences has been awarded since 1969. Nobel Prizes have been awarded to over 800 individuals.

Africans have received awards in five of the six Nobel prize categories: Peace, Physics, Physiology or Medicine, Literature and Chemistry. The first Black African recipient, Albert Luthuli, was awarded the Peace Prize in 1960 and the first White African who received the prize was Max Theiler in 1951 for Physiology or Medicine. The most recent recipients, Ellen Johnson Sirleaf and Leymah Gbowee, were awarded the Nobel Prize in 2011.

A notable recipient of the Nobel Peace Prize is Nelson Mandela (1918–2013) the first democratically elected president of South Africa, who played a key role in the repeal of apartheid laws . He was awarded the Nobel Peace Prize in 1993 alongside President F.W. de Klerk

Two African laureates, Anwar Sadat of Egypt in 1978 and F.W. de Klerk of South Africa in 1993, were presidents of their countries at the time they were awarded the Nobel Prize. Sadat was honored along with Israeli Prime Minister Menachem Begin for their efforts to reach a peace agreement between their two countries. DeKlerk was awarded the Nobel Peace Prize along with Nelson Mandela, who led the ANC but was not president of South Africa until 1994.

Laureates

References

African
Nobel Laureates
Nobel laureates